Oberonia carnosa, commonly known as the rockpile fairy orchid, is a plant in the orchid family and is a clump-forming epiphyte. It has between four and six leaves in a fan-like arrangement and large numbers of tiny orange brown flowers arranged in whorls around the flowering stem.

Description
The flowering stem has whorls of tiny bracts near its base. The sepals and petals are egg-shaped and spread widely apart from each other, the petals with teeth on their edges and the sepals curved backwards. Flowering occurs between February and June.

Taxonomy and naming
Oberonia carnosa was first formally described in 1977 by Bill Lavarack who published the description in the journal Austrobaileya from a specimen he collected from Tozer's Gap on Cape York Peninsula. The specific epithet (carnosa) is a Latin word meaning "fleshy".

Distribution and habitat
The rockpile fairy orchid grows on trees in sparse scrub in humid places and on trees and boulders in an area of large boulders known as "The Rockpiles". It is found between the Iron and McIlwraith Ranges.

References

carnosa
Endemic orchids of Australia
Plants described in 1977
Orchids of Queensland